CASHU is a digital wallet that allows consumers to pay and transfer money online, and issue prepaid virtual and plastic Mastercard. The company was established by Maktoob (currently “Jabbar Internet Group”) in July 2002, and it is headquartered in the British Virgin Islands (BVI).

In addition to the Company's headquarters in the British Virgin Islands; the Company has an office in Amman, Jordan, and an office in Cairo, Egypt, through which all CASHU operations are managed.

History

Early History
In 2002 CASHU was launched as an alternative online payment method for the use of credit cards online,.

On August 25, 2009, Yahoo! acquired Maktoob in a deal that exceeded $85 million. According to the agreement between the two companies, the deal did not include the rest of Maktoob’s products, including CASHU, Souq.com, Araby and Tahadi MMO games, which became part of Jabbar Internet Group headed by Maktoob founder, and Tiger Global as the major shareholder.

Souq Group Subsidiary (2012-2015)
In 2012, Naspers Limited took a stake alongside Jabbar Internet Group and Tiger Global in CASHU and Souq.com, and so it was listed under the umbrella of Souq Group, which included Souq.com, Sukar.com and Qexpress (a logistics and shipping company), as well as CASHU.

While Souq Group continued to focus on the e-commerce field, CASHU has grown towards cashless societies and Financial Inclusion and started to move away from the vision of Souq, especially that the regulations and compliance conditions for electronic payments in general and e-wallets in particular are still in the development stage in the region, so CASHUtleft Souq Group.

Later in 2013, CASHU launched a new online payment gateway, PAYFORT.

The Management Buyout (2015 – present)
In December 2015, CASHU Management purchased CASHU in the first Management Buyout deal in the Middle East,.

Regulation 
After the management buyout was completed, CASHU in 2016 migrated its business to Singapore and got approved to operate as a Stored Value Facility by the Monetary Authority of Singapore. All CASHU's merchants, vendors, and consumers were then required to maintain a full KYC (Know Your Customer) record that complies with MAS’ rules and regulations, which was a major step towards regulating the core business of CASHU.

This has caused an immediate loss of business and irritation to the authorities of Saudi Arabia, who didn’t feel comfortable sharing its citizen ID’s with a non-regulated entity. Accordingly, the Saudi Arabian Monetary Agency blocked CASHU website in Saudi Arabia on January 28, 2016.

On October 1, 2016, CASHU partnered with Mastercard and Noor Bank in the United Arab Emirates to launch the first prepaid virtual card in the region, which is approved by the Central Bank of the UAE. This product gave CASHU legal approval to operate in the UAE as a FinTech Company in cooperation with Noor Bank.

Later on, Bank Albilad in Saudi Arabia announced on October 10, 2016, that it has entered into a strategic partnership with CASHU to develop innovative payment products and services in Saudi Arabia. The partnership with Bank Albilad allowed CASHU to recommence its operations in Saudi Arabia before the end of 2016 since it had met the requirements of the Saudi Arabian Monetary Authority.

In October 2017, CASHU and Bank Albilad completed the compliance requirements of SAMA and received its approval to operate in KSA. Bank Albilad issued a letter to CASHU allowing it to operate in KSA accordingly.

References

External links 
 Official Website
CASHU's Management Buyout

Payment service providers
Maktoob